Maywood is a mainly-rental low-income residential neighborhood in Burnaby, and is a part of the larger Metrotown area. The neighborhood consists of low-rise apartments built during the population boom in the Metrotown area in the 1970s, and 1980s, although the neighborhood is quickly changing. Geographically, the Maywood neighbourhood's boundaries are Grange Street and Kingsway to the north, Nelson Avenue and Bennett and Bonsor Streets to the east, Imperial Street to the south and Boundary Road to the west, and it includes Central Park.

According to the 2006 census Maywood has 15,390 people, and is a fast growing immigrant neighbourhood. Maywood takes its name from the elementary school located within it.

Maywood also has a large Filipino Canadian population.

Schools
Maywood Community School (K-7)

Shopping and attractions
Due to Maywood's location it enjoys much shopping space such as Metropolis at Metrotown the second-largest indoor shopping mall in Canada, Crystall mall which is a Chinese-themed mall, and Station Square Shopping Center. It also has Central Park, the Burnaby Public Library, and local parks.

Transportation

Maywood is mainly served by Metrotown station, but also Patterson station in central park. It is also served by the Metrotown bus loop, located on Central Boulevard

References

External links

Populated places in Greater Vancouver
Neighbourhoods in Burnaby